NorthStar is an international company, which produces lead–acid batteries and battery cabinets. NorthStar's products are used in Telecom Power Systems, Uninterruptible Power Supplies and Engine Start applications. The headquarters of the parent company, NorthStar Group, is based in Stockholm, Sweden. NorthStar Group oversees two business units: NorthStar SiteTel, which produces battery cabinets, and is based in Sollentuna, Sweden; and NorthStar Battery, which produces lead–acid batteries, and is based in Missouri, United States. NorthStar also has offices in Shanghai and Shenzhen, China; and Nashik, India; as well as global distribution and service centers in Panama, Dubai and Singapore.

History
The company was founded in 2000. NorthStar sell many of its products to international OEMs, such as Ericsson, Nokia Siemens Network and Huawei and is a member of the Advanced Lead-Acid Battery Consortium.

In January 2010, NorthStar entered into a joint venture with Artheon Battery Company to manufacture a complete line of lead–acid batteries for the domestic battery markets in India and the export markets around the world.   

In July 2010, NorthStar Battery Company built a second manufacturing plant, to increase capacity from 1 to 1.8 million batteries per year.

In November 2010, Exide announced a collaboration with NorthStar, to sell NorthStar engine start batteries under the Exide brand.

In 2016, NorthStar signed a deal with Daimler Trucks.

In 2019, EnerSys bought Northstar from its previous owner, Altor Fund II.

Enersys subsequently began selling some former NorthStar battery products.

References

External links
 

Battery manufacturers
Manufacturing companies based in Stockholm
Swedish brands